The Golden Tiki is a tiki bar located on Spring Mountain Road in Las Vegas, Nevada. It was opened for business in 2015 by Lev Group.  On June 30, 2020, The Golden Tiki closed for a few days after an employee tested positive for COVID-19.

World's largest Mai Tai

On September 2, 2022, The Golden Tiki produced a 100-gallon Mai Tai consisting of 300 bottles of liquor, the largest ever made.

Reception
In her writeup of the best nightlife in Las Vegas, USA Today's Terrisa Meeks recommended The Golden Tiki because "A night at the Golden Tiki will transport you to a tropical paradise, complete with strong drinks, music and plenty of kitsch."

In their list of best cocktail bars in Las Vegas, Thrillist writers Rob Kachelriess, and Nicole Rupersburg called the decor "over the top kitschy" and the bar as having an "inspired" craft cocktail menu.

References

2015 establishments in Nevada
Tiki bars
Drinking establishments in Nevada
Restaurants in Las Vegas, Nevada